

Qualification rules
A nation may earn up to 1 boat in each of the 11 Sailing events.

Summary

Qualification Timeline

Men's events

Windsurfer – RS:X

One-person dinghy – Laser

Two-person dinghy – 470

Keelboat – Star

Women's events

Windsurfer – RS:X

One-person dinghy – Laser Radial

Two-person dinghy – 470

Keelboat – Yngling

Open events

Heavyweight one-person dinghy – Finn

Skiff – 49er

Multihull – Tornado

References 
 ISAF - Nations Qualified

Qualification for the 2008 Summer Olympics
2008
Qualification